Ganseki Otoshi is a hand throw in judo. It is described in The Canon Of Judo as a reference technique and demonstrated by Kyuzo Mifune
in the video, The Essence of Judo.

See also
The Canon Of Judo

References

Judo technique
Grappling
Grappling hold
Grappling positions
Martial art techniques